Donald McAlpine (December 5, 1869 – May 12, 1925) was an Ontario farmer, veterinarian and political figure. He represented Brockville in the Legislative Assembly of Ontario from 1919 to 1923.

He was born in Vankleek Hill, Ontario, the son of John McAlpine and Annie Grant, and was educated at McGill University, receiving a DVS. He was a member of the Freemasons. He died on May 12, 1925.

References 

 Canadian Parliamentary Guide, 1922, EJ Chambers

External links 

1869 births
1925 deaths
McGill University Faculty of Agricultural and Environmental Sciences alumni
Ontario Liberal Party MPPs